Song Na (born 30 August 1995) is a Chinese biathlete. She was born in Heilongjiang. She competed at the 2014 Winter Olympics in Sochi, in the sprint and individual competitions.

References

External links

1995 births
Living people
Sport shooters from Heilongjiang
Biathletes at the 2014 Winter Olympics
Chinese female biathletes
Olympic biathletes of China
Biathletes at the 2012 Winter Youth Olympics
Skiers from Heilongjiang
21st-century Chinese women